Treaties are binding agreements under international law.

Treaty or treaties or variation may also refer to:

 a particular treaty, see List of treaties
 Treaty (festival), a music festival held at Tandanya National Aboriginal Cultural Institute, Adelaide, South Australia, from 2020
 Treaty, Indiana, USA; an unincorporated community
 "Treaty" (song), a 1991 song by Yothu Yindi

See also

 Indigenous treaties in Australia
 The Numbered Treaties (ie. Treaty 6, Treaty 8, etc)
 Unequal treaty
 
 
 
 Search for disambiguation pages for "treaty"
 Search for disambiguation pages for "treaties"
 Treatise (disambiguation)